Admiral Sir George Le Clerc Egerton  (17 October 1852 – 30 March 1940) was a senior Royal Navy officer from the Egerton family who rose to become Second Sea Lord.

Naval career
Egerton joined the Royal Navy in 1866. He served on the Arctic Expedition of 1875–76. In 1893 he was promoted to Captain and appointed a Naval Attaché before serving with the Naval Brigade in Mombasa in 1895, and he was Chief of Staff for the Benin Expedition of 1897.

By early 1900 he was in command of the pre-dreadnought battleship HMS Majestic, serving as flagship to Vice-Admiral Sir Harry Rawson, Commander-in-Chief of the Channel Fleet. In June 1901 he was transferred to the President for service as Assistant Director of Torpedoes at the Admiralty, a position he left the following February when he transferred to the torpedo school ship Vernon.

He was appointed Second-in-Command of the Atlantic Fleet in 1906: Egerton flew his flag on HMS Victorious, with Captain Robert Scott as his flag captain. He became Commander-in-Chief, Cape of Good Hope Station in 1908 and Second Sea Lord in 1911. He served in World War I as Commander-in-Chief, Plymouth. He had previously served as ADC to King Edward VII, and retired in 1916.

Family
A grandson of The Rev Sir Philip Grey-Egerton, 9th Bt, he married, first, in 1882, Frances Emily Gladstone; they had two sons and a daughter, including rear-admiral Brian Egerton (1886–1973).  He married, second, Margaret Stella Maunsell, in 1932.

References

External links

 

|-

|-

1852 births
1940 deaths
People from Cheshire
Royal Navy admirals of World War I
Knights Commander of the Order of the Bath
Lords of the Admiralty